Moro Airport is an airfield in Moro, in the Southern Highlands Province of Papua New Guinea.

Airlines and destinations

References

External links
 

Airports in Papua New Guinea
Southern Highlands Province